Dawn of the Dead may refer to:

In film 
 Dawn of the Dead (1978 film), a 1978 horror film written and directed by George A. Romero
 Dawn of the Dead (2004 film), a 2004 remake of the 1978 film directed by Zack Snyder

In music 
 "Dawn of the Dead" (song), a 2008 single by the electronic rock band Does It Offend You, Yeah?
 "Dawn of the Dead", a song by Schoolyard Heroes from the 2003 album The Funeral Sciences
 "Dawn of the Dead", a song by Murderdolls from the 2002 album Beyond the Valley of the Murderdolls